Stephanofilaria stilesi is a species of filarial worm. It is a parasite of cattle. It causes the disease stephanofilariasis.

References

Parasitic diseases
Rhabditida
Nematodes described in 1934